The following is a list of moths of the family Uraniidae of Nepal. Twenty-three different species are listed.

This list is primarily based on Colin Smith's 2010 "Lepidoptera of Nepal", which is based on Toshiro Haruta's "Moths of Nepal (Vol. 1-6)" with some recent additions and a modernized classification.

Subfamily Auzeinae
Auzea arenosa
Auzea rufifrontata
Dirades theclata

Subfamily Epipleminae
Epiplema adamantina
Epiplema arcuata
Epiplema bicaudata
Epiplema fulvilinea
Epiplema fuscifrons
Epiplema himala
Epiplema indignaria
Epiplema nivea
Epiplema ocusta
Epiplema puncticulosa
Epiplema restricta
Epiplema reticulata
Epiplema ruptaria
Gathynia simulans
Metorthocheilus emarginata
Orudiza protheclaria
Paradecetia albistellaria

Subfamily Microniinae
Micronia aculeata
Micronia simplicata

Subfamily Uraniinae
Lyssa zampa zampa

See also
List of butterflies of Nepal
Odonata of Nepal
Cerambycidae of Nepal
Wildlife of Nepal

References

 01
N
Uraniidae
Insects of Nepal
Nepal